Giancarlo Guerrini (born 29 December 1939) is an Italian water polo player who competed in the 1960 Summer Olympics, in the 1964 Summer Olympics, and in the 1968 Summer Olympics.

He was born in Rome.

In 1960 he was a member of the Italian water polo team which won the gold medal. He played two matches and scored three goals.

Four years later he finished fourth with the Italian team in the water polo competition at the Tokyo Games. He played five matches.

At the 1968 Games he was part of the Italian team which finished again fourth in the Olympic water polo tournament. He played all nine matches and scored three goals.

See also
 Italy men's Olympic water polo team records and statistics
 List of Olympic champions in men's water polo
 List of Olympic medalists in water polo (men)

External links
 

1939 births
Living people
Italian male water polo players
Water polo players at the 1960 Summer Olympics
Water polo players at the 1964 Summer Olympics
Water polo players at the 1968 Summer Olympics
Olympic gold medalists for Italy in water polo
Medalists at the 1960 Summer Olympics
Water polo players from Rome